Acmaeopsoides rufula is a species of beetle in the family Cerambycidae, and the only species in the genus Acmaeopsoides. This beetle is distributed in Canada, and United States.

References

 

Lepturinae